Whitchurch (Shropshire) railway station serves the town of Whitchurch in Shropshire, England. The station is 18¾ miles (30 km) north of Shrewsbury on the Welsh Marches Line. The station is maintained and served by Transport for Wales.

History
The station opened on 1 September 1858 by the LNWR-backed Crewe and Shrewsbury Railway. It was once the junction for the Cambrian Railways Oswestry, Ellesmere and Whitchurch Railway line to Oswestry and Welshpool (the former Cambrian mainline to ), and the Whitchurch and Tattenhall Railway. The former was closed as a result of the Beeching Axe in January 1965, whilst the latter was closed to passengers by the British Transport Commission in September 1957 and completely in January 1963.

The site of the former junctions can still be seen from passing trains.

Operation
The station has two platforms and a footbridge. There used to be a large signal box here (which was latterly switched out of use, although operational if required) but this was closed and demolished in 2012 whilst the one-time goods shed has been turned into a garage. The former up loop and down bay platforms have both had their track removed (the former is fenced off) and the main buildings (booking hall, waiting room and offices) have also been demolished.

The station is unstaffed (though it does have a ticket machine) with waiting shelters on both platforms. Train running information is offered by means of CIS displays and timetable poster boards.  Step-free access is only possible to the northbound platform, as the footbridge is not accessible for disabled passengers.

The last major work carried out on Whitchurch station was the replacement of the original railway bridge that had become damaged by an oversized lorry load.

Services
On Sundays, the service is somewhat infrequent and irregular (6 trains each way) but runs through to Manchester & Cardiff.

References

Sources

Further reading

External links 

Railway stations in Shropshire
DfT Category F1 stations
Former London and North Western Railway stations
Railway stations in Great Britain opened in 1858
Railway stations served by Transport for Wales Rail
Whitchurch, Shropshire